Tuotantotalo Werne was a Finnish company that provided audio-visual productions in Finland and all across the Baltic.

They are also known for a number of children's cartoon dubs made for MTV3 and Nelonen, largely supplementing the now defunct Agapio Racing Team in the early 2000s. They began to gather popularity after the success of Pokémon.

Famous dubs

 Avatar
 Animaniacs
 Battle B-Daman
 Batman: The Animated Series
 Lazy Lucy
 Rugrats
 The Powerpuff Girls
 LazyTown
 Caillou
 Superman
 Power Rangers
 TaleSpin
 Jesus and Josephine
 Digimon Adventure (episodes 27-54) 
 Digimon Adventure 02 (episodes 01-27)
 VeggieTales
 Bob the Builder

Tuotantotalo Werne took over the dubbing duties for Digimon Adventure from Agapio Racing Team from episode 27 onwards. Starting from season three onwards the show has been seen in Japanese with Finnish subtitles.

Dubbed the 2006 re-release of Biker Mice from Mars, that was previously dubbed by Film&Cartoon Finland in the 1990s.

See also
 Golden Voice OY
 Agapio Racing Team

External links
Official Website

References 

Finnish animation studios